William John Gordon ( – 25 November 2022) was an Australian indigenous politician. He was a member of the Queensland Legislative Assembly from 2015 to 2017, representing the electorate of Cook.

Career
Hailing from Innisfail, Queensland, Gordon first entered politics as the Labor candidate in the federal seat of Leichhardt for the 2013 election, losing to Liberal National incumbent Warren Entsch.  However, he increased his profile enough that he was able to successfully stand in the state seat of Cook, essentially the far northern portion of the federal seat. Gordon was elected as a Labor candidate at the 2015 election before becoming an independent two months later. He retired at the 2017 election. 

Gordon was one of the first indigenous Queensland state MPs in a generation.

Controversy
In 2015, Gordon was sacked by the Labor Party following disclosures of a criminal record dating back to 1980. In 2015, tip offs to the media led to Gordon publicly disclosing a criminal history dating back to the 1980s that he had not disclosed to his colleagues including driving offences, break and entering offences, breach of bail and probation, and an apprehended violence order taken out by his mother.

Gordon's former de facto partner accused him of domestic violence and routinely not filing tax returns to avoid child support payments to his five children.

In response Premier Annastacia Palaszczuk expelled Gordon from the Labor caucus, and asked the state party's organisational wing to have Gordon expelled from the party altogether. Although Palaszczuk was well aware that the loss of Cook could potentially have put her premiership in jeopardy, she said that given the circumstances, she had no other choice.

In September 2015, Queensland Police dropped the domestic violence charges against Gordon, citing insufficient evidence to prosecute. On the same day, police charged a woman with extortion for allegedly attempting to blackmail Gordon by claiming he had sent her an explicit image by SMS.

Gordon was charged with drink driving and unlicensed driving on 1 June 2016 while pulled over at a random traffic stop on the Kennedy Highway at Kuranda, on the Atherton Tableland west of Cairns.  He was taken to the Kuranda police station and allegedly returned a blood-alcohol content reading of 0.094.

On 1 July 2016, Gordon pleaded guilty to both charges in the Brisbane Magistrates Court. He was fined $750 and disqualified from driving for four months.

Retirement
Gordon retired from politics at the 2017 election, having confirmed that he would not recontest his seat on 31 October 2017 following the calling of the election.

Gordon died on 25 November 2022, aged 49.

References

External links

Year of birth missing
1970s births
2022 deaths
Members of the Queensland Legislative Assembly
Indigenous Australian politicians
People from Innisfail, Queensland
Australian Labor Party members of the Parliament of Queensland
Australian politicians convicted of crimes
Independent members of the Parliament of Queensland
21st-century Australian politicians